Kashmir Park (formerly KMC Park / Askari Amusement Park) is an amusement park located in Karachi, Pakistan.

History 
The park opened on 15 June 2018 and is Karachi's first Amusement Park. The amusement park includes a 61 metre high ferris wheel, known as the Karachi Eye.

Askari Amusement Park is also called Askari Island Of Fun. It offers many kind of indoor games and rides for kids and adults it also has a very huge food court where you can find many famous food chains and variety of foods and drinks. It also offers the wheelchair facility for people with disabilities.

Kashmir Park is run by the Karachi Metropolitan Corporation. Administrator Karachi Barrister Murtaza Wahab renamed Erstwhile Askari Park as Kashmir Park.

Incidents

On 15 July 2018, a 12-year-old girl was killed and 25 others were injured when the Discovery ride collapsed in mid-air.

After this incident the Askari Amusement Park was reopened on 13 February 2019. According to the park management, the park was opened “after a change in management”. “We have adopted international standards to prevent such sort of incidents from happening,” CEO Askari Park Brig. (Retd) Shehzad told reporters.

References

Amusement parks in Pakistan
Amusement parks opened in 2018
2018 establishments in Pakistan